Lake Gore is a seasonal and semi-permanent freshwater lake in the Goldfields-Esperance region of Western Australia located approximately  west of Esperance.  It is an important site for waterbirds.

Description
The lake is almost circular in shape and has several smaller lakes located to the west including Lake Kubitch and Carbul Lake. A larger lake, Quallilup Lake is located further to the south near Shelley Beach. The lake and its surrounds are situated in the Albany-Fraser Orogen with alluvial sediments overlying gneiss, sandstone and limestone on a sub-coastal plain. The lake itself is a sub-terminal drainage basin.

Hydrology
The lake is recharged mostly via surface flow from the Dalyup River directly into Lake Gore with Coobidge Creek supplying many of the surrounding lake systems.

The water is colourless and has low tannin levels. The salinity of the river varies depending on rainfall, the minimum salinity is recorded as 6.5ppt but the September mean is 52ppt. Salinity levels rise as the lake dries out in summer.  The pH of the lake water fluctuates between 7.1 and 9.4.  The water quality and salinity levels are regularly monitored by local school students as part of the Ribbons of Blue program.

Flora and fauna
The wetlands support a narrow zone of woodland composed of saltwater paperbark, with an understorey of sedges such as coastal saw-sedge and Schoenus brevifolius.  The area is a suitable habitat for a variety of birds, with over 20,000 visiting the lake each year.  It supports the largest known population of hooded plover, holding up to one third of the global population.  It is important as a moulting site for Australian shelduck, and as a drought refuge for large numbers of ducks and shorebirds.  It also supports up to 10% of the global population of banded stilt.  The Lake Gore system has been identified by BirdLife International as an Important Bird Area (IBA) because it supports over 1% of the world population of hooded plovers and has also supported over 1% of the world populations of Australian shelducks and banded stilts.

Protection
Lake Gore is part of Nature Reserve 32419, set aside for conservation purposes. The Dalyup River flows into the eastern end of the lake. The lake is also a DIWA-listed wetland.

See also

 List of lakes of Western Australia

References

Gore
Gore
Gore
Important Bird Areas of Western Australia